The 1974 World Fencing Championships were held in Grenoble, France.

Medal table

Medal summary

Men's events

Women's events

References

FIE Results

World Fencing Championships
1974 in French sport
Sports competitions in Grenoble
International fencing competitions hosted by France
1974 in fencing
20th century in Grenoble